Church Slavonic, also known as Church Slavic, New Church Slavonic or New Church Slavic, is the conservative Slavic liturgical language used by the Eastern Orthodox Church in Belarus, Bosnia and Herzegovina, Bulgaria, North Macedonia, Montenegro, Poland, Ukraine, Russia, Serbia, the Czech Republic and Slovakia, Slovenia and Croatia. The language appears also in the services of the Russian Orthodox Church Outside of Russia, the American Carpatho-Russian Orthodox Diocese, and occasionally in the services of the Orthodox Church in America.

In addition, Church Slavonic is used by some churches which consider themselves Orthodox but are not in communion with the Orthodox Church, such as the Montenegrin Orthodox Church and the Russian True Orthodox Church. The Russian Old Believers and the Co-Believers also use Church Slavonic.

Church Slavonic is also used by Greek Catholic Churches in Slavic countries, for example the Croatian, Slovak and Ruthenian Greek Catholics, as well as by the Roman Catholic Church (Croatian and Czech recensions).

In the past, Church Slavonic was also used by the Orthodox Churches in the Romanian lands until the late 17th and early 18th centuries, as well as by Roman Catholic Croats in the Early Middle Ages.

Historical development
Church Slavonic represents a later stage of Old Church Slavonic, and is the continuation of the liturgical tradition introduced by two Thessalonian brothers, Saints Cyril and Methodius, in the late 9th century in Nitra, a principal town and religious and scholarly center of Great Moravia (located in present-day Slovakia). There the first Slavic translations of the Scripture and liturgy from Koine Greek were made.

After the Christianization of Bulgaria in 864, Saint Clement of Ohrid and Saint Naum of Preslav were of great importance to the Eastern Orthodox faith and the Old Church Slavonic liturgy in the First Bulgarian Empire. The success of the conversion of the Bulgarians facilitated the conversion of East Slavic peoples, most notably the Rus', predecessors of Belarusians, Russians, and Ukrainians. A major event was the development of the Cyrillic script in Bulgaria at the Preslav Literary School in the 9th century. The Cyrillic script and the liturgy in Old Church Slavonic, also called Old Bulgarian, were declared official in Bulgaria in 893.

By the early 12th century, individual Slavic languages started to emerge, and the liturgical language was modified in pronunciation, grammar, vocabulary and orthography according to the local vernacular usage. These modified varieties or recensions (e.g. Serbian Church Slavonic, Russian Church Slavonic, Ukrainian Church Slavonic in Early Cyrillic script, Croatian Church Slavonic in Croatian angular Glagolitic and later in Latin script, Czech Church Slavonic, Slovak Church Slavonic in Latin script, Bulgarian Church Slavonic in Early Cyrillic and Bulgarian Glagolitic scripts, etc.) eventually stabilized and their regularized forms were used by the scribes to produce new translations of liturgical material from Koine Greek, or Latin in the case of Croatian Church Slavonic.

Attestation of Church Slavonic traditions appear in Early Cyrillic and Glagolitic script. Glagolitic has nowadays fallen out of use, though both scripts were used from the earliest attested period.

The first Church Slavonic printed book was the Missale Romanum Glagolitice (1483) in angular Glagolitic, followed shortly by five Cyrillic liturgical books printed in Kraków in 1491.

Recensions

The most widespread recension, Russian, has several local sub-dialects in turn, with slightly different pronunciations.

These various Church Slavonic recensions were used as a liturgical and literary language in all Orthodox countries north of the Mediterranean region during the Middle Ages, even in places where the local population was not Slavic (especially in Romania). In recent centuries, however, Church Slavonic was fully replaced by local languages in the non-Slavic countries. Even in some of the Slavic Orthodox countries, the modern national language is now used for liturgical purposes to a greater or lesser extent.

The Russian Orthodox Church, which contains around half of all Orthodox believers, still holds its liturgies almost entirely in Church Slavonic. However, there exist parishes which use other languages (where the main problem has been a lack of good translations). Examples include:
 According to the decision of the All-Russian Church Council of 1917–1918, service in Russian or Ukrainian can be permitted in individual parishes when approved by church authorities.
 Parishes serving ethnic minorities in Russia use (entirely or in part) the languages of those populations: Chuvash, Mordvinic, Mari, Tatar (for Keräşens), Sakha (Yakut), etc.
 Autonomous parts of the Russian Orthodox Church prepare and partly use translations to the languages of the local population, as Ukrainian, Belarusian, Romanian (in Moldova), Japanese, and Chinese.
 Parishes in the diaspora, including ones of the Russian Orthodox Church Outside Russia, often use local languages: English, French, Spanish, German, Dutch, Portuguese, etc.

What follows is a list of modern recensions or dialects of Church Slavonic. For a list and descriptions of extinct recensions, see the article on the Old Church Slavonic language.

Russian (Synodal) recension
The Russian recension of New Church Slavonic is the language of books since the second half of the 17th century. It generally uses traditional Cyrillic script; however, certain texts (mostly prayers) are printed in modern alphabets with the spelling adapted to rules of local languages (for example, in Russian/Ukrainian/Bulgarian/Serbian Cyrillic or in Hungarian/Slovak/Polish Latin).

Before the eighteenth century, Church Slavonic was in wide use as a general literary language in Russia. Although it was never spoken per se outside church services, members of the priesthood, poets, and the educated tended to slip its expressions into their speech. During the seventeenth and eighteenth centuries, it was gradually replaced by the Russian language in secular literature and was retained for use only in church.  Although as late as the 1760s, Lomonosov argued that Church Slavonic was the so-called "high style" of Russian, during the nineteenth century within Russia, this point of view declined. Elements of Church Slavonic style may have survived longest in speech among the Old Believers after the late-seventeenth century schism in the Russian Orthodox Church.

Russian has borrowed many words from Church Slavonic. While both Russian and Church Slavonic are Slavic languages, some early Slavic sound combinations evolved differently in each branch. As a result, the borrowings into Russian are similar to native Russian words, but with South Slavic variances, e.g. (the first word in each pair is Russian, the second Church Slavonic):  /  ( / ),  /  ( / ),  /  ( / ),  /  ( / ).  Since the Russian Romantic era and the corpus of work of the great Russian authors (from Gogol to Chekhov, Tolstoy, and Dostoevsky), the relationship between words in these pairs has become traditional.  Where the abstract meaning has not commandeered the Church Slavonic word completely, the two words are often synonyms related to one another, much as Latin and native English words were related in the nineteenth century: one is archaic and characteristic of written high style, while the other is found in common speech.

Standard (Russian) variant
In Russia, Church Slavonic is pronounced in the same way as Russian, with some exceptions:
 Church Slavonic features okanye and yekanye, i.e., the absence of vowel reduction in unstressed syllables.
 There should be no de-voicing of final consonants, although in practice there often is.
 The letter е  is never read as ё ~ (the letter ё does not exist in Church Slavonic writing at all). This is also reflected in borrowings from Church Slavonic into Russian: in the following pairs the first word is Church Slavonic in origin, and the second is purely Russian: небо / нёбо (nebo / nëbo), надежда / надёжный (nadežda / nadëžnyj).
 The letter Γ can traditionally be read as voiced fricative velar sound  (just as in Southern Russian dialects); however, occlusive  (as in standard Russian pronunciation) is also possible and has been considered acceptable since the beginning of the 20th century. When unvoiced, it becomes ; this has influenced the Russian pronunciation of Бог (Bog) as Boh [box].

Serbian variant
In Serbia, Church Slavonic is generally pronounced according to the Russian model. The medieval Serbian recension of Church Slavonic was gradually replaced by the Russian recension since the early eighteenth century. The differences from the Russian variant are limited to the lack of certain sounds in Serbian phonetics (there are no sounds corresponding to letters ы and щ, and in certain cases the palatalization is impossible to observe, e.g. ть is pronounced as т etc.).

Ukrainian or Rusyn variant
Ukrainian or Kyivan variant of Church Slavonic existed since Christianization of the Rus. Following annexation of Ukrainian lands by the Muscovite state (today known as the Russian Federation), all liturgy was changed to New Muscovite or Synodal variant, while Ukrainian variant remained in western portion of Ukraine that became part of the Austrian Empire.

A main difference between Russian and Ukrainian variants of Church Slavonic as well as the Russian "Civil Script" lies in the pronunciation of the letter yat (ѣ). The Russian pronunciation is the same as е ~ whereas the Ukrainian is the same as и . Greek Catholic variants of Church Slavonic books printed in variants of the Latin alphabet (a method used in Austro-Hungary and Czechoslovakia) just contain the letter "i" for yat.
Another major difference is the use of Ґ in the Rusyn variant. Г is pronounced as h and Ґ is pronounced as G. For example, Blagosloveno is Blahosloveno in Rusyn variants.

Typographically, Serbian and Ukrainian editions (when printed in traditional Cyrillic) are almost identical to the Russian ones. Certain visible distinctions may include:
 less frequent use of abbreviations in "nomina sacra";

Old Moscow recension
The Old Moscow recension is in use among Old Believers and Co-Believers. The same traditional Cyrillic alphabet as in Russian Synodal recension; however, there are differences in spelling because the Old Moscow recension reproduces an older state of orthography and grammar in general (before the 1650s). The most easily observable peculiarities of books in this recension are:
 using of digraph  not only in the initial position,
 hyphenation with no hyphenation sign.

Croatian recension

This is in limited use among Croatian Catholics. Texts are printed in the Croatian Latin alphabet (with the addition of letter  for yat) or in Glagolitic script. Sample editions include:
 Ioseph Vais, Abecedarivm Palaeoslovenicvm in usvm glagolitarvm. Veglae, [Krk], 1917 (2nd ed.). XXXVI+76 p. (collection of liturgical texts in Glagolitic script, with a brief Church Slavonic grammar written in Latin language and Slavonic-Latin dictionary)
 Rimski misal slavĕnskim jezikom: Čin misi s izbranimi misami..., Zagreb: Kršćanska sadašnjost, 1980 (The ISBN specified even at the publisher 978-953-151-721-5 is bad, causing a checksum error) (in Croatian Latin script)

Czech recension
Church Slavonic is in very limited use among Czech Catholics. The recension was developed by Vojtěch Tkadlčík in his editions of the Roman missal:
 Rimskyj misal slověnskym jazykem izvoljenijem Apostolskym za Arcibiskupiju Olomuckuju iskusa dělja izdan. Olomouc 1972.
 Rimskyj misal povelěnijem svjataho vselenskaho senma Vatikanskaho druhaho obnovljen... Olomouc 1992.

Grammar and style
Although the various recensions of Church Slavonic differ in some points, they share the tendency of approximating the original Old Church Slavonic to the local Slavic vernacular. Inflection tends to follow the ancient patterns with few simplifications. All original six verbal tenses, seven nominal cases, and three numbers are intact in most frequently used traditional texts (but in the newly composed texts, authors avoid most archaic constructions and prefer variants that are closer to modern Russian syntax and are better understood by the Slavic-speaking people).

In Russian recension, the fall of the yers is fully reflected, more or less to the Russian pattern, although the terminal ъ continues to be written.  The yuses are often replaced or altered in usage to the sixteenth- or seventeenth-century Russian pattern.  The yat continues to be applied with greater attention to the ancient etymology than it was in nineteenth-century Russian. The letters ksi, psi, omega, ot, and izhitsa are kept, as are the letter-based denotation of numerical values, the use of stress accents, and the abbreviations or titla for nomina sacra.

The vocabulary and syntax, whether in scripture, liturgy, or church missives, are generally somewhat modernised in an attempt to increase comprehension.  In particular, some of the ancient pronouns have been eliminated from the scripture (such as етеръ  "a certain (person, etc.)" → нѣкій in the Russian recension). Many, but not all, occurrences of the imperfect tense have been replaced with the perfect.

Miscellaneous other modernisations of classical formulae have taken place from time to time.  For example, the opening of the Gospel of John, by tradition the first words written down by Saints Cyril and Methodius, (искони бѣаше слово) "In the beginning was the Word", were set as "искони бѣ слово" in the Ostrog Bible of Ivan Fedorov (1580/1581) and as въ началѣ бѣ слово in the Elizabethan Bible of 1751, still in use in the Russian Orthodox Church.

See also
 Outline of Slavic history and culture
 List of Slavic studies journals
 List of Glagolitic books
 List of Glagolitic manuscripts
 Old Church Slavonic

Notes

References

External links

 Old Church Slavonic and the Macedonian recension of the Church Slavonic language, Elka Ulchar 
 Orthodox Christian Liturgical Texts in Church Slavonic
 Bible in Church Slavonic language (Wikisource), (PDF) , (iPhone), (Android) 
 Problems of computer implementation 
 Slavonic - the input tool for Church Slavonic 
 
 Church Slavonic Virtual Keyboard
 CyrAcademisator Transliteration tool for Church Slavonic including a virtual keyboard.
 Slavonic Computing Initiative
 The textbook of the Church Slavonic language "Literacy" - online version (with soundtrack).

 
Eastern Orthodox liturgy
Christian liturgical languages